La usurpadora, is a Venezuelan telenovela created by Inés Rodena and adapted by Ana Mercedes Escámez for Radio Caracas Televisión in 1971. This was the first adaptation that made the original story of Inés Rodena. Marina Baura and Raúl Amundaray star as the main protagonists.

Cast

References

External links 

1971 telenovelas
Venezuelan telenovelas
Spanish-language telenovelas
RCTV telenovelas
1971 Venezuelan television series debuts
1972 Venezuelan television series endings
Television shows set in Venezuela